
The Mezhyhirya Savior-Transfiguration Monastery (Mezhyhirskyi Spaso-Preobrazhenskyi Monastyr) was an Eastern Orthodox female monastery that was located in the neighborhood of Mezhyhiria.

The monastery served as a historic Princely residency of Rurik dynasty during the Medieval times located just  to the north of Vyshhorod. Today, the territory is part of the Vyshhorod Raion, Kyiv Oblast (province) in northern Ukraine. The location is situated in the Mezhyhirya ravine, on the right bank of the Dnieper River in close proximity to the Kyiv Reservoir.

Founded in 988 AD, the Mezhyhirya Monastery was one of the first monasteries established in the East Slavic state of Kievan Rus'. Throughout its existence, it was destroyed, and then restored numerous times, yet it was not spared destruction by Soviet authorities in 1935. At the time of its height, the Mezhyhirya Monastery was considered a spiritual center of Rus royal Rurikid house and later Cossacks. Currently, the area of the former monastery is located on a fenced-in woodland territory next to Novi Petrivtsi village and is now a museum.

As an important monastery of the Zaporozhian Host, the Mezhyhirya Monastery left a rich legacy behind it. The monastery was mentioned in one of Taras Shevchenko's poems, "Chernets," written in 1847, and was the subject of a drawing by him. Nikolai Gogol's novel, "Taras Bulba," published in 1835, also mentions the monastery.

History

Foundation and early history
The monastery is mentioned for the first time in the early 14th century, although Yevgeniy Bolkhovitinov claimed that it had been founded by the first Metropolitan of Kiev, Michael, along with Greek monks arriving from Byzantium in 988 AD. The claim is likely spurious, since Mezhyhirya is not listed by modern authors among the monasteries of Kievan Rus.

In 1154, the Prince of Vladimir-Suzdal Yuri Dolgoruki divided the territory surrounding the monastery's grounds amongst his sons. His son Andrei I Bogolyubsky received the lands nearest to the monastery, now the city of Vyshhorod. Not too long afterwards, he is alleged to have moved the monastery to its current location in the hills of the Dnieper, giving the monastery its name, "Mezhyhirya." Bogolyubsky despised the city of Kiev, therefore moving to Suzdal, in modern-day Russia. On his trip, he took with him the "Theotokos of Vladimir" icon, a gift from Constantinople Patriarch Luke Chrysoberges to Dolgoruki. The icon is one of the most venerated Orthodox icons, now located in the Tretyakov Gallery in Moscow.

With the Mongol invasion of Rus' by Batu Khan in 1237-40, the monastery is supposed to have been completely destroyed. These legends were written down much later. The monastery is known to have existed in the 14th century, though. In 1482, it was attacked by the Crimean Tatars under Meñli I Giray. Reconstruction on the monastery began only 40 years later. In 1523, the monastery was transferred to the King of Poland and Grand Duke of Lithuania Sigismund I. In addition, the monastery was given a full reign over its territory. In 1555, the complex consisted of four churches, including and one cave church.

Cossack monastery

During the 16th century, the monastery frequently lost and regained its ownership rights. On the funds of the monastery's new hegumen Afanasiy (a protégé of prince Konstanty Wasyl Ostrogski), the monastery's old buildings were demolished, and new ones were built in their place. In 1604, the Gate Church of Ss. Peter and Paul was constructed, in 1609 - the Mykilska Refectory, and the Transfiguration Cathedral in 1609-1611. Under his rule, the monastery was considered as the second lavra (cave monastery) in Ukraine.

After its reconstruction, the Mezhyhirya Monastery became a regional center of the Zaporozhian Host, serving the host as a military monastery. In 1610, the monastery received the status of a stauropegic monastery (orthodox church autonomy), under the Patriarch of Constantinople. The universal (act) of Hetman Bohdan Khmelnytsky issued on May 21, 1656 transferred the neighboring settlements of Vyshhorod, Novi Petrivtsi, and Moshchun under control of the Mezhyhirya Monastery. In effect, the universal made Khmelnytsky the monastery's ktitor. After the destruction of the Trakhtemyrivskyi Monastery by a Polish szlachta army, the Mezhyhirya Monastery replaced it as the main cossack military monastery. As a military monastery, retired and elderly cossacks from the Zaporozhian Host would now come to the monastery to retire and live in until the end of their lives. At that time, the monastery's expenses were paid off with the help of the cossack's Sich Host.

In 1676, the area was burned down after a fire started in the wooden Transfiguration Cathedral. With the help of Ivan Savelov, a monk who lived in the monastery and later became a Patriarch of Moscow, the complex was reconstructed. Two years later, with the help of the cossack community, the Annunciation Church was constructed near the monastery's hospital.

In 1683, the Sich Rada voted that the ministers in the Sich's Pokrovskyi Cathedral (the main cathedral of the sich) should be only from the Mezhyhirya Monastery. In 1691, monasteries located near the Sich were placed under the Mezhyhirya Monastery's authority. Under hegumen Feodosiy at the end of the 17th century, considered as a period of prosperity, the Mezhyhirya Monastery became one of the largest monastery's in Ukraine.

At the request of Peter I of Russia, the stauropegic status of the monastery was revoked; it was later reinstated in 1710. In 1717, a large fire destroyed a large portion of the monastery's buildings. The monastery's "military" status was reconfirmed by cossacks in 1735. In 1774, with the funds of the last Koshovyi Otaman Petro Kalnyshevsky, the Ss. Peter and Paul Church was reconstructed. Ukrainian architect Ivan Hryhorovych-Barskyi designed some of the buildings, including the monk's residence.

Decline and Soviet demolition 
A period of decline began with the abolition of the Zaporozhian Host by Catherine II of Russia. In 1786 the Russian Imperial government closed the monastery and confiscated its valuable treasures. The remaining Zaporozhian Cossacks soon afterwards left Zaporizhia, and moved to the Kuban region. There they founded the Kuban Cossack Host, which still exists to this day. The cossacks were able to leave with some of the monastery's manuscripts, some of which are now kept in the Krasnodar Krai Archive.

In 1787, Catherine II of Russia came to Kyiv for a visit and wished to see the Mezhyhirya Monastery. She never got to see it, because the monastery mysteriously burned down the night before her arrival.

In 1796, a German engineer found that the area had suitable clay for the making of faience, and two years later, founded the Mezhyhirya Faience Factory, the first one in Ukraine, at the site of the unused monastery. By 1852, the faience factory had become the largest industrial complex in Kyiv. During its existence, the factory produced a variety of crockery and ornamental vases and figurines. In 1884, the faience factory was closed down after it failed to bring any profit.

In 1894, the Mezhyhirya Monastery was rebuilt and transformed into a women's monastery. After its reconstruction, the monastery was transferred to the authority of the Intercession of the Saints Monastery in Kyiv.

After the Russian Revolution, the Ukrainian Soviet Socialist Republic's capital moved from Kharkiv to Kyiv in 1934, and the city was in need of a suburban residence for government officials. Mezhyhirya was chosen as the site of the new government residence. The decision of the Politburo in April 1935 ordered the demolition of the whole complex. Before the scheduled demolition in 1936, the architecture and buildings of the monastic complex were photographed. During the demolition, an underground library was discovered, full of handwritten manuscripts. There are speculations that the discovered books belonged to the lost library of Yaroslav the Wise, or perhaps of a later period, during the times of the Zaporozhian Host. The only thing that remains now of the monastic complex is a water well.

During Soviet times, the area served as a residence for Leonid Brezhnev and Volodymyr Shcherbytsky, who worked in the Ukrainian Soviet Socialist Republic's government at the time. During this period, its location was concealed from the public.

Ownership controversy

In 2008 the Mezhyhirya residence was amid an ownership controversy between the former Ukrainian Prime Minister Viktor Yanukovych and the new Ukrainian government, led by Prime Minister Yulia Tymoshenko. The transfer of the 1.4 km² Mezhyhirya official residence in Novi Petrivtsi, Vyshhorod Raion (district) to the "Nadra Ukraine" firm on July 11, 2007 by Viktor Yanukovych pulled the territory from under government ownership.

Private residence of Viktor Yanukovych

On July 9, 2007, President Viktor Yushchenko signed a secret presidential decree #148, according to the local business newspaper Delo which referred to the information of the State Directorate of Affairs. The document states: "The government dacha on the territory of the recreational complex "Pushcha-Vodytsia" is presented for a use to the head of Kabmin, Viktor Yanukovych." Later the document has never appeared on the website of the head of state nor in any other open source of information. A single official confirmation of it was given to the newspaper by the State Directorate of Affairs. The directorate explained that the recreational complex "Pushcha-Vodytsia" includes the recreational resort "Pushcha-Vodytsia" and the Mezhyhirya residency. The residency that is located in the village of Novi Petrivtsi was occupied by Yanukovych in the last several years.

The newspaper notes that at the same time, July 9, at the website of the President appeared another document - an order in which he obliged the prime-minister to execute the decision of the RNBO and secure the financing of early elections. The newspaper speculated that it was a trade exchange of power for the state dacha. In the late February 2008 Yanukovych confirmed that he indeed possesses a dacha in the Mezhyhirya residency awarded by a presidential decree. According to the data of the State Directorate of Affairs, the territory of residency occupies . It is enclosed in perimeter by a five-meter [tall] iron fence and inside it is secured by operatives of "Titan". Yanukovych also stated that with help of the State Directorate of Affairs he was able to conduct a substantial renovations of the property and confirms that in 2007 some area was bought by some private entity after which he had to pay monthly ₴11,000 for rent. In interview to BBC he acknowledged that lives at the Mezhyhirya's cottage sometime since 1999 or 2000.

Further developments

On July 11, 2007, Yanukovych issued a government order #521, according to which the National Joint-Stock Company "Nadra Ukrainy" received the state residency and a territory of 137 ha in Mezhyhirya. Soon "Nadra Ukrainy" concluded a barter with another company "Medinvesttreid" (Medinvesttrade) after which the above-mentioned government assigned residence was exchanged for two properties at Parkova alleya (Park alley) in Kyiv. "Medinvesttreid", in its turn, sold the newly acquired property of "Nadra Ukrainy" to some other company "Tantalit". Since May 2008 the Ministry of the Interior was conducting a search for the director of "Medinvesttreid", Hennadiy Herasymenko, who in their opinion was involved in a scheme to get the former state residence out of state property. On February 12, 2008 Yushchenko signed a decree for relieving a state property security personnel from duties at the State cottages area in Mezhyhirya. His decree canceled the previous presidential decree of January 12, 2006 where the security personnel was assigned to properties at Zalissya, instead of Zalissya and Mezhyhirya.

Subsequently, Prime Minister Viktor Yanukovych privatized the complex, already residing there while prime minister. At the time, the property's price was estimated at around ₴1 billion (US$200 million). After Yulia Tymoshenko's election, her cabinet annulled the decree which transferred the property to the "Nadra Ukraine" firm, and again placed the territory under government control. However, on July 28, 2008, the Economic Court of Kyiv City annulled the Cabinet's decision and returned the Mezhyhirya residence back under Yanukovych's ownership.

References
Notes

Footnotes

Bibliography

External links

 
  
 
 
 
 

Houses completed in 1894
Buildings and structures in Kyiv Oblast
Zaporozhian Host
Eastern Orthodox monasteries in Ukraine
Former religious buildings and structures in Ukraine
Christian monasteries established in the 10th century
1935 disestablishments in Europe
Demolished churches in Ukraine
Monasteries of the Ukrainian Orthodox Church (Moscow Patriarchate)
Religious buildings and structures completed in 988